Jajpur Lok Sabha constituency is one of the 21 Lok Sabha (parliamentary) constituencies in Odisha state in eastern India.

Assembly segments
Following delimitation, this constituency presently comprises the following legislative assembly segments:

Before delimitation in 2008, legislative assembly segments which constituted this parliamentary constituency were: Sukinda, Korai, Jajpur, Dharamsala, Barchana, Bari-Derabisi, Binjharpur, .

Members of Parliament
2019: Sarmistha Sethi, BJD
2014: Rita Tarai, BJD
2009: Mohan Jena, BJD
2004: Mohan Jena, BJD
1999: Jagannath Mallick, BJD
1998: Rama Chandra Mallick, INC
1996: Anchal Das, Janata Dal
1991: Anadi Charan Das, Janata Dal
1989: Anadi Charan Das, Janata Dal
1984: Ananta Prasad Sethi, INC
1980: Anadi Charan Das
1977: Rama Chandra Mallick, INC
1971: Anadi Charan Das
1967: Baidhar Behara, PSP
1962: Rama Chandra Mallick, INC
1957:Constituency does not exist
1952: Lakshmi Dhar Jena, GP
1952: Bhubananda Das, INC

Election Result

2019 Election Result

2014 Election Result
In 2014 election, Biju Janata Dal candidate Rita Tarai defeated Indian National Congress candidate Asok Das by a margin of 3,20,271 votes.

General Election 2009

References

 

Lok Sabha constituencies in Odisha
Jajpur district